was a king of the Ryukyu Kingdom of the First Shō dynasty. He ruled from 1439 to 1444.  Shō Chū was the second son of his father, King Shō Hashi. After his father conquered the Kingdom of Hokuzan, Shō Chū was appointed  in 1422. Shō Chū was installed as the king after his father's death. During his reign, Ryukyu began to trade with Java.

References
Chūzan Seifu(中山世譜)

Kings of Ryūkyū
First Shō dynasty
1391 births
1444 deaths